John Jones (born March 12, 1943) is an American former professional basketball player.

A 6'7" small forward from California State University, Los Angeles, Jones played one season (1967-68) in the National Basketball Association as a member of the Boston Celtics. He averaged 4.2 points per game and won an NBA Championship ring when the Celtics defeated the Los Angeles Lakers in the 1968 NBA Finals. He later played for the Kentucky Colonels of the American Basketball Association.

External links 

1943 births
Living people
Allentown Jets players
American men's basketball players
Basketball players from Washington, D.C.
Boston Celtics players
Cal State Los Angeles Golden Eagles men's basketball players
DeMatha Catholic High School alumni
Kentucky Colonels players
Milwaukee Bucks expansion draft picks
Small forwards
Undrafted National Basketball Association players
Wilkes-Barre Barons players